Greta N. Morris (born 1947) is a former United States Ambassador to the Republic of the Marshall Islands. She took office on August 26, 2003. She was replaced in the ambassadorial post by Clyde Bishop on December 6, 2006.

Education
A native of Redlands, California, Ms. Morris earned her B.A. from the University of Redlands and an M.A. in English from the University of California, Los Angeles. Prior to joining the Foreign Service, she taught English at the high school and university levels in California and Indonesia. She was formerly the dean of the Department of State's School of Language Studies at the Foreign Service Institute.

Career
A career member of the Senior Foreign Service, Ms. Morris was most recently the Counselor for Public Affairs in Jakarta, where she led the U.S. Embassy’s public diplomacy program to strengthen U.S.-Indonesia ties and to build support within Indonesia for counter-terrorism efforts.

Prior to her posting in Jakarta, Ms. Morris served as Deputy Director of the Office of Public Diplomacy in the Bureau for East Asian and Pacific Affairs. Previously, she had postings as Counselor for Public Affairs in The Philippines, as Public Affairs Officer in Uganda, and as Press Attaché in Thailand. Ms. Morris has also served as Director of the Office of Public Affairs in the Bureau of African Affairs, Information Center Director in Nairobi, Kenya, and Cultural and Exchanges Coordinator for Africa.

Ms. Morris joined the Foreign Service in 1980. She is the recipient of two Superior Honor Awards and three Senior Foreign Service Performance Pay Awards. She speaks Indonesian, Thai, and French.

Her hobbies include swimming, playing the cello and choral singing.

References

External links
United States Department of State: Biography of Greta Morris

1947 births
Living people
Ambassadors of the United States to the Marshall Islands
American women ambassadors
People from Redlands, California
United States Foreign Service personnel
University of Redlands alumni
University of California, Los Angeles alumni
21st-century American diplomats
21st-century American women